Radhi (also Radi) is a village in eastern Bhutan, in the district of Trashigang.

Famous people from Radhi
 Olympic archery athlete Tshering Chhoden.

Populated places in Bhutan